John Henry Bryant (26 November 1930 – 31 May 2010) was an Australian sports shooter. He competed in the trap event at the 1956 Summer Olympics.

References

1930 births
2010 deaths
Australian male sport shooters
Olympic shooters of Australia
Shooters at the 1956 Summer Olympics